Triallist or trialist may refer to:

A person who takes part in trials, in particular,
Time trialist
A Trialist
An advocate of trialism (philosophy)
An advocate of trialism (politics)

See also
 Trialism (disambiguation)